Tun Sir Raja Uda Al-Haj bin Raja Muhammad   (1894 – 17 October 1976) was a Malaysian statesman during the country's struggle for independence and its early years of nationhood. He was a civil servant under the British colonial administration, and eventually rose to important administrative positions within the government. Upon the independence of Malaya in 1957, he became the first Yang di-Pertua Negeri (Governor) of Penang, one of the four states in Malaysia without a hereditary ruler.

Raja Uda was also the grandfather of Malaysian political blogger Raja Petra Kamaruddin.

Biography
Raja Uda was a member of the Selangor royal family, being a distant cousin of Sultan Hisamuddin Alam Shah and a direct descendant of the first Sultan of Selangor. He married Sultan Hisamuddin's sister, Tengku Badariah binti Sultan Alaeddin Sulaiman Shah.

Educated at the Malay College Kuala Kangsar. Raja Uda joined the colonial government service in 1910 at age 16. In 1939, he was appointed as secretary to the British Resident of Selangor. He was Menteri Besar of Selangor twice, from 1949 to 1953, and again from 1954 to 1955. In between, Raja Uda served as Malayan High Commissioner in the United Kingdom. He was involved in negotiations with the British to establish the Member System in the 1950s.

In 1951, Raja Uda was appointed a CMG and appointed an Honorary Knight Commander of the Most Excellent Order of the British Empire in 1953,. Following the first ever general election in 1955, Raja Uda was appointed Speaker of the Federal Legislative Council.

On August 30, 1957, the day before independence, Raja Uda was appointed the first Governor of the state of Penang and served for ten years.

Raja Tun Uda died on October 17, 1976 and he was buried at the Selangor royal mausoleum near Sultan Sulaiman Mosque in Klang, Selangor.

Legacy
Several projects and institutions were named after him, including:
 The neighbourhood of Kampung Raja Uda, Port Klang, Selangor
  Kampung Raja Uda Komuter station
  Raja Uda MRT station
Perpustakaan Raja Tun Uda or Raja Tun Uda Library in Shah Alam, Selangor.
The Weld Quay in George Town, Penang was renamed Pengkalan Raja Tun Uda.
Sekolah Menengah Kebangsaan Raja Tun Uda (SMKRTU) in Bayan Lepas, Penang
Masjid Jamek Raja Tun Uda, the first mosque built in Shah Alam, Selangor located at Section 16.

Streets
Jalan Raja Uda in Butterworth, Penang

Honours

Honour of Penang 
 As 1st Yang di-Pertua Negeri of Penang ( – )
  Grand Master and Knight Grand Commander of the Order of the Defender of State ( – )

  : 
 Grand Commander of the Order of the Defender of the Realm (SMN) – Tun (1958)
 :
 Recipient of the Malaysian Commemorative Medal (Gold) (PPM) (1965)

Foreign Honours 
  :
 King George VI Coronation Medal (1937)
 Commander of the Order of the British Empire (CBE) (1947)
 Companion of the Order of St Michael and St George (CMG) (1951)
 Honorary Knight Commander of the Order of the British Empire (KBE) - Sir (1953)

Notes

References

Royal House of Selangor
People from Selangor
Malaysian people of Malay descent
Malaysian Muslims
Yang di-Pertua Negeri of Penang
1894 births
1976 deaths
Chief Ministers of Selangor
Selangor state executive councillors
High Commissioners of Malaysia to the United Kingdom

Grand Commanders of the Order of the Defender of the Realm

Honorary Knights Commander of the Order of the British Empire
Honorary Commanders of the Order of the British Empire
Honorary Companions of the Order of St Michael and St George